Quinson is a commune in the Alpes-de-Haute-Provence department in southeastern France.

History

Prehistory
In the nearby Gorges du Verdon, there are a number of caves (known as "baumes"), which were occupied intermittently for over 400,000 years. The most significant of these caves is the "Baume Bonne", which has been studied by various archaeologists, including Henry de Lumley.

The Baume Bonne was occupied first during the end of the Lower Paleolithic, 400,000 years ago. It was occupied again 150–300,000 years ago. Tools made using the Levallois technique have been found dating from this era. Neanderthals inhabited the caves later, around 130,000 years ago. Remains of cave bears dating from this period have been found. The Neanderthals were eventually succeeded by Cro-Magnon men, who occupied the cave during the Upper Paleolithic. Finally, modern humans lived in the cave during Neolithic.

Population

See also
 Coteaux de Pierrevert AOC
Communes of the Alpes-de-Haute-Provence department

References

Communes of Alpes-de-Haute-Provence
Alpes-de-Haute-Provence communes articles needing translation from French Wikipedia